José Manuel Moreiras (September 16, 1976 – December 29, 2019) was an Argentine footballer. He played for several clubs. His last team was Sport Huancayo of the Primera División in Peru. He was born in Rosario, Argentina. He died aged 49, after being assaulted in the Dominican Republic.

Teams
  Rosario Central 1995–1996
  Blooming 1997–1998
  Gimnasia y Esgrima de Jujuy 1999–2001
  Olmedo 2001–2002
  Millonarios 2003
  Audaz Octubrino 2003–2004
  Unión La Calera 2005
  LDU Portoviejo 2005
  LDU Loja 2006
  Brasilia 2007–2009
  Sport Huancayo 2010–2019

Titles
  Rosario Central 1995 (Copa Conmebol)

References

External links
 José Manuel Moreiras at BDFA.com.ar 

1976 births
2019 deaths
Argentine footballers
Argentine expatriate footballers
Gimnasia y Esgrima de Jujuy footballers
Rosario Central footballers
C.D. Olmedo footballers
L.D.U. Loja footballers
L.D.U. Portoviejo footballers
Club Blooming players
Millonarios F.C. players
Unión La Calera footballers
Primera B de Chile players
Categoría Primera A players
Expatriate footballers in Chile
Expatriate footballers in Peru
Expatriate footballers in Bolivia
Expatriate footballers in Ecuador
Expatriate footballers in Colombia
Argentina youth international footballers

Association footballers not categorized by position
Footballers from Rosario, Santa Fe